Alex Crombie (born 1876) was an English footballer who played as a winger for Reading and Burslem Port Vale at the start of the 20th century.

Career
Crombie played for Morpeth Harriers and Southern League side Reading, before joining Second Division club Burslem Port Vale in July 1905. He scored in a 4–3 win over Chesterfield at the Athletic Ground on 9 September, and was a regular first team player from September 1905 to February 1906, at which point he lost his first team place. He departed at the end of the 1905–06 season, having made 17 league and five cup appearances for the Vale.

Career statistics
Source:

References

1876 births
Year of death missing
People from Berwick-upon-Tweed
Footballers from Northumberland
English footballers
Association football wingers
Reading F.C. players
Port Vale F.C. players
Southern Football League players
English Football League players